Pomaderris prunifolia, commonly known as plum leaf pomaderris, is a plant in the family Rhamnaceae. It has slightly toothed, wrinkled green leaves, stems with rusty coloured star-shaped hairs and yellow flowers.

Description
The yellow flowers are borne in a panicle formation on a short pedicel. The seed capsule has long, rusty hairs and the hypanthium long whitish hairs.

Taxonomy
Pomaderris prunifolia was first formally described in 1837 by Eduard Fenzl and the description was published in  Enumeratio plantarum quas in Novae Hollandiae ora austro-occidentali ad fluvium Cygnorum et in sinu Regis Georgii collegit Carolus Liber Baro de Hügel.

Distribution and habitat
Plum-leaf pomaderris is an uncommon species, it grows south of the Hunter Valley, west of the Nandewar Range and Chandler River gorge in rocky situations, mostly near creeks.

References

Flora of New South Wales
prunifolia
Flora of Victoria (Australia)
Flora of Queensland
Taxa named by Eduard Fenzl
Plants described in 1837